Noor-ul-Haq Qadri is a Pakistani politician who was Federal Minister for Religious Affairs and Inter-faith Harmony (20 August 2018 – 10 April 2022). He had been a member of the National Assembly of Pakistan from August 2018 till January 2023. Previously, he was a member of the National Assembly from 2002 to 2013.

Personal life
He holds a PhD degree.

A Sunni, he belongs to the Barelvi school of thought. He is a prominent religious figure in Landi Kotal and has a large following. His brother Hafiz Abdul Malik is also a politician, having been a senator.

Political career
He was elected to the National Assembly of Pakistan from Constituency NA-45 (Tribal Area-X) as an independent candidate in 2002 Pakistani general election. He received 9,121 votes and defeated an independent candidate, Ajab Khan Afridi. Reportedly, he served as Minister for Religious Affairs in the federal cabinet during the rule of former President Pervez Musharraf.

He was re-elected to the National Assembly from Constituency NA-45 (Tribal Area-X) as an independent candidate in 2008 Pakistani general election. He received 13,876 votes and defeated an independent candidate, Mohammad Ibrahim Koki Khel. In November 2008, he was inducted into the federal cabinet of Prime Minister Yousaf Raza Gillani and was appointed as Federal Minister for Zakat and Ushr where he continued to serve until December 2010. He remained a member of the federal cabinet without portfolio from December 2010 to February 2011.

He ran for the seat of the National Assembly from Constituency NA-45 (Tribal Area-X) as an independent candidate in 2013 Pakistani general election but was unsuccessful. He received 20,181 votes and lost the seat to Alhaj Shah Jee Gul Afridi.

He joined Pakistan Tehreek-e-Insaf (PTI) in November 2017.

He was re-elected to the National Assembly as a candidate of PTI from Constituency NA-43 (Tribal Area-IV) in 2018 Pakistani general election. He received 33,243 votes and defeated Alhaj Shah Jee Gul Afridi.

On 18 August, Imran Khan formally announced his federal cabinet structure and Qadri was named as Minister for Religious Affairs and Inter-faith Harmony. On 20 August 2018, he was sworn in as Federal Minister for Religious Affairs and Inter-faith Harmony in the federal cabinet of Prime Minister Imran Khan.

He condemned the 2020 Karak temple attack, where a mob of 1,500 local Muslims led by a local Islamic cleric and the supporters of  Jamiat Ulema-e-Islam party attacked and burnt the temple.

References

Pashtun people
People from Khyber District
Living people
Pakistan Tehreek-e-Insaf MNAs
Pakistani MNAs 2002–2007
Pakistani MNAs 2008–2013
Pakistani MNAs 2018–2023
Federal ministers of Pakistan
Year of birth missing (living people)
Barelvis